East Branch Oil Creek is a 10.9-mile (17.5 km) 4th order tributary to Oil Creek in Crawford County, Pennsylvania.

Course
East Branch of Oil Creek rises at the confluence of Stranahan and Patrick Runs in Clear Lake.  It then flows south and southwest through the Erie Drift Plain to Centerville, Pennsylvania where it joins Oil Creek.

Tributaries

Watershed
East Branch Oil Creek drains  of area, receives about 46.0 in/year of precipitation, has a topographic wetness index of 467.92, and has an average water temperature of 7.56 °C.  The watershed is 49% forested.

References

Additional Maps

Rivers of Pennsylvania
Rivers of Crawford County, Pennsylvania